Richard Heinze (11 August 1867, Naumburg, Province of Saxony – 22 August 1929, Bad Wiessee) was a German classical philologist. He was a younger brother to politician Rudolf Heinze (1865–1928).

He studied classical philology at the University of Leipzig under Otto Ribbeck (1827–1898), later relocating to the University of Bonn (1887), where he had as instructors, Hermann Usener (1834–1905) and Franz Bücheler (1837–1908). Afterwards, he studied in Berlin with Theodor Mommsen (1817–1903), earning his habilitation in 1893 at the University of Strasbourg with a treatise on the philosopher Xenocrates.

In 1900 he became an associate professor in Berlin, and in 1903 became a full professor at the University of Königsberg. From 1906 until his death in 1929 he was a professor at the University of Leipzig. In 1923 he succeeded Georg Wissowa (1859–1931) as editor of the magazine Hermes.

Richard Heinze is remembered for his expert analysis of ancient authors that included Ovid, Lucretius and Virgil. His best written effort was the 1903 Virgils Epische Technik, a work that was later translated into English and published as Virgil's Epic Technique.

References 
 This article is based on a translation of an equivalent article at the German Wikipedia, one of its sources being listed as NDB/ADB Deutsche Biographie.

1867 births
1929 deaths
People from Naumburg (Saale)
People from the Province of Saxony
German classical philologists
Academic staff of Leipzig University
Academic staff of the University of Königsberg